András Gerevich is a Hungarian poet, screenwriter, literary translator and Professor of Screenwriting at Budapest Metropolitan University.

Life and career
Andras Gerevich was born in Budapest, Hungary in 1976. He grew up in Budapest, Dublin and Vienna. He graduated with a major in English Language and Literature and a minor in Aesthetics from ELTE School of English and American Studies. Later he was a Fulbright student at Dartmouth College in the United States, and received his third degree in screenwriting from the National Film and Television School (NFTS) in the UK. He is openly gay.

He was the president of József Attila Kör (JAK), the Hungarian Young Writers Association from 2006 to 2009. He edited the literary journals Kalligram, Chroma and contributed to Clamantis: The MALS Journal. He has also written articles for magazines like Magyar Narancs and PRAE. He has taught courses in Creative Writing, Poetry and Screenwriting at Vassar College in Poughkeepsie, New York, Budapest Metropolitan University, Milestone Institute and McDaniel College in Budapest.

Gerevich's first book of Poetry Átadom a pórázt (Handing Over the Leash) was first Published in 1997. Since then four more volumes of his poetry has been published. His poetry features homoerotic themes. He also wrote homoerotic poetry under several pseudonyms for magzines like Mások. In 2008, his poems were translated into English under the title ″Tiresias's Confession″. In 2017, Andrew Fentham received the Stephen Spender Prize for the translation of his poem ″Balaton Accident″ into English.  Gerevich himself has translated many English poems and books into Hungarian. His first book of translation Különös gyümölcs (Strange Fruit), which was an anthology of translation of Seamus Heaney's poems was published in 1997.

Works

Bibliography

Articles

Poetry

Poems

Translations

Thesis

Filmography

Plays
Playwright

Radio
 Assistant producer, Poetry by Post, BBC World Service, 2005

See also
Monika Rinck – translated Gerevich's work into German.
Nikolay Boykov – translated Gerevich's work into Bulgarian.

References

Further reading

External links 

Living people
Hungarian male poets
Hungarian male screenwriters
Gay poets
Gay screenwriters
Hungarian gay writers
Hungarian LGBT screenwriters
Hungarian LGBT poets
Writers from Budapest
Hungarian translators
Translators to Hungarian
21st-century Hungarian poets
21st-century Hungarian male writers
21st-century screenwriters
21st-century translators
Alumni of the National Film and Television School
Dartmouth College alumni
Eötvös Loránd University alumni
Fulbright alumni
Vassar College faculty
Academic staff of Eötvös Loránd University
1976 births